2013 Rally Argentina (officially: 33rd Philips Rally Argentina) was the fifth rally in the 2013 World Rally Championship hold between 1 and 4 May. It had 14 special stages totalling 407.64  competitive kilometres. 24 out of 32 racer finished the rally successfully.

Report 

After missing the rallies of Mexico and Portugal to compete in the FIA Grand Touring Series, Sébastien Loeb marked his return to rallying with first place in the Rally Argentina. Sébastien Ogier took the lead early on, but made a mistake whilst driving in heavy fog. He lost forty seconds, allowing Loeb to seize the advantage. Jari-Matti Latvala and Mikko Hirvonen fought over the final podium position until Hirvonen's Citroën DS3 WRC developed an electrical problem. Latvala could not afford to rest, as he found himself fighting with Evgeny Novikov. A late charge on the final day—including the fastest time on the power stage—was enough for Latvala to secure third place and his first podium in Argentina. Hirvonen recovered to finish sixth overall, finishing third on the power stage to score an additional World Championship point.

Entry list 

Thirteen World Rally Cars were entered into the event, as were eight entries in the WRC-2 championship for cars built to Group N and Super 2000 regulations.

Special stages

Power Stage

Result

References

External links 
Official website

Argentina
Rally Argentina
Rally